Hanjagi  is a village in the southern state of Karnataka, India. It is located in the Indi taluk of Bijapur district in Karnataka.

Demographics
 India census, Hanjagi had a population of 5462 with 2920 males and 2542 females.

See also
 Districts of Karnataka

References

External links
 http://Bijapur.nic.in/ 

Villages in Bijapur district, Karnataka